Maurice Kepple (born 7 July 1981) is a Jamaican cricketer. He played in eleven first-class matches for the Jamaican cricket team from 2002 to 2005.

See also
 List of Jamaican representative cricketers

References

External links
 

1981 births
Living people
Jamaican cricketers
Jamaica cricketers
People from Westmoreland Parish